Ryan Emerson Wilcox Harris (born March 11, 1985) is a former American football offensive tackle  of the National Football League (NFL). He was drafted by the Denver Broncos in the third round of the 2007 NFL Draft and also played for the Philadelphia Eagles, Houston Texans, Kansas City Chiefs, and Pittsburgh Steelers. With the Broncos, he won Super Bowl 50 over the Carolina Panthers. He played college football at Notre Dame.

Early years
Harris attended Cretin-Derham Hall High School in St. Paul, Minnesota and was a letterman in football and wrestling. In wrestling, he was a two-year letterman and an All-Conference honoree.  He played in the 2003 U.S. Army All-American Bowl with fellow Notre Dame teammates Brady Quinn, John Carlson, Victor Abiamiri and Tom Zbikowski.

College career
Heavily recruited by Notre Dame, Iowa, Miami (FL), and Michigan, Harris committed to play for the Fighting Irish, where he started at offensive tackle for four seasons.

Professional career

Denver Broncos

Harris was drafted by the Denver Broncos as a 3rd round pick (70th overall) in the 2007 NFL draft.
In the 2008 season, Harris only allowed 1.5 sacks on QB Jay Cutler.

In the 2009 season, Harris only started and played in 8 games. He dislocated two toes in a game on November 1, 2009. The injury kept him out the rest of season and was placed on Injured Reserve on December 9.

Philadelphia Eagles
On August 2, 2011, the Philadelphia Eagles signed him to a one-year contract. After undergoing back surgery, Harris was waived/injured on September 3, 2011. He was released with an injury settlement as well.

Second stint with Broncos
On January 2, 2012, Harris was signed by the Broncos as an injury replacement for Chris Kuper.

Harris was released by the Broncos on August 31, 2012, and signed by the Houston Texans on September 1, 2012, to replace an injured Rashad Butler who was lost for the season to injury.

Houston Texans
The Houston Texans claimed Harris off waivers on September 3, 2012.

He re-signed with the Texans on April 9, 2013.

Kansas City Chiefs
On July 24, 2014, Harris signed with the Kansas City Chiefs.

Third stint with Denver Broncos
Harris signed with the Denver Broncos on May 28, 2015. He was signed to replace injured offensive tackle Ryan Clady who was injured on May 28, 2015, due to an ACL tear sustained during the Broncos' OTA's.

On February 7, 2016, Harris was part of the Broncos team that won Super Bowl 50. In the game, the Broncos defeated the Carolina Panthers by a score of 24–10.

Pittsburgh Steelers
Harris signed a two-year, $3.2 million contract with the Pittsburgh Steelers on March 15, 2016.

Harris played in 39 of the Steelers offensive snaps before it was announced on October 4, 2016, that he was questionable for the Week 5 matchup against the New York Jets. He was ruled out due to a shin/hematoma injury. On October 8, 2016, Harris was placed on injured reserve and was ruled out for the rest of the season.

On March 3, 2017, Harris announced his retirement from professional football.

Personal life
Harris is a devout Muslim.  Before finding his faith, he was raised in the church of Unitarian Universalism, at Unity Church Unitarian in St. Paul. In the summer before attending Notre Dame, Harris was featured on the MTV show True Life in a documentary entitled "I Want the Perfect Body", back in 2003. He is currently an on-air host at KKSE-FM radio.

References

External links

Denver Broncos bio 
Notre Dame Fighting Irish bio

1985 births
Living people
Players of American football from Minneapolis
African-American Muslims
American Muslims
Converts to Islam
American football offensive tackles
Notre Dame Fighting Irish football players
Denver Broncos players
Philadelphia Eagles players
Houston Texans players
Kansas City Chiefs players
Pittsburgh Steelers players